The murder of Rachael Runyan is an unsolved child murder which occurred in Sunset, Utah, on August 26, 1982, when a three-year-old girl was abducted from a playground and murdered by an unknown individual. Her body was found three weeks later in a creek bed in nearby Morgan County.

One of Utah's most notorious cold cases, Rachael's murder ultimately proved a catalyst to establish the "Rachael Alert" child abduction alert system, which remained in use in the state of Utah until 2003, when the state adopted the national AMBER alert child abduction emergency alert system.

The abduction and murder of Rachael Runyan was a factor in the 1983 passage of the US Congressional Missing Children's Act, which mandated an allocation of additional resources for the investigation of ongoing missing children cases.

In 2017, the Rachael Runyan Missing and Exploited Children's Day was signed into legislation in Utah. The purpose of the annual observance is to raise public awareness of missing and exploited children within the state; the annual awareness date is August 26, the date of Rachael's abduction. Runyan's abduction and murder remain unsolved.

Background
Rachael Marie Runyan was born on June 23, 1979, in Weber County, Utah, the second child and only daughter of Jeff and Elaine Runyan. She had an older brother, Justin, and a younger brother, Nathan.

The Runyan family had moved to Sunset from Tennessee just before Rachael's birth; her mother would later recall she and her husband had believed Sunset—then a community of 6,000 inhabitants—would be a "wonderful and safe place" to raise their children. Rachael was a child beauty queen, having been crowned "Little Miss Sunset" the year before her murder. She has been described by her mother as a well-behaved child who, often being too young to participate in playground games with Justin and other children, was content to simply sit aside and suck her thumb watching the other children play. This habit had led to her mother occasionally teasing Rachael that she would become "bucktoothed" as an adult, to which Rachael would simply giggle. Despite the sense of security Jeff and Elaine Runyan felt within the community of Sunset, both parents repeatedly warned their children of the dangers of trusting anybody they did not know who attempted to lure them from their home or any safe environment.

The family lived in a modest home adjacent to the Doxey Elementary School playground. A park the three children were fond of in which they regularly played, Mitchell Park, was also near their home. In the summer of 1982, Jeff and Elaine Runyan installed a gate in their backyard fence, so the family could easily access this playground.

Abduction
In the late morning of August 26, 1982, Rachael Runyan and her five-year-old brother Justin asked their mother if they and their younger brother Nathan, aged 18 months, could play in the playground of Doxey Elementary School. Although Elaine Runyan had never allowed her children to play unsupervised anywhere outside the family home, because she was preparing lunch for her children when they made the request, and the school playground was just  from her home, well within sight of her kitchen window, she agreed to it. Nonetheless, Runyan looked repeatedly out the kitchen window and conversed with her children as she prepared the meal.

When she called her children to lunch at approximately 12:55 p.m., only Nathan and Justin returned home. Justin blurted out to her that Rachael had been taken from the park by force moments before by a young black man who had initially offered to buy her ice cream and bubble gum at a nearby supermarket. According to Justin, the man had approached them as they played in the sandpit, attempting to lure the siblings into his car with an offer to purchase candy for the trio. When they were close to the man's car, Rachael told him she liked bubble gum–flavored ice cream. The man claimed to have this flavor of ice cream in his car. Justin said when he warned Rachael not to accompany the man any further, she began to turn and walk away from him. In response, he simply picked Rachael up and placed her over his shoulder before bundling her, screaming, into his car as Justin stood frozen in fear with Nathan standing by his side.

Elaine rushed to the supermarket the kidnapper had mentioned, repeatedly asking staff and shoppers: "Have you seen a little blond girl? A 3-year-old with a black man?" Nobody she encountered had seen her child. Approximately 20 minutes after her daughter's disappearance, Elaine reported Rachael's abduction to the Sunset Police Department.

Investigation
Immediately upon learning of Rachael's abduction, the Sunset Police Department set up roadblocks in and around the city. This tactic failed to help police apprehend the suspect or to recover Rachael. In the hours following her abduction, a task force consisting of ten law enforcement investigators was formed to investigate the child's disappearance. These investigators were recruited from several Utah counties and supervised by Sheriff Brant Johnston.

He drove an older model four-door dark-blue car with wood-grain stripes along the sides. The man had been at Mitchell Park, talking to various children and drinking coffee for a minimum of 15 minutes before abducting Rachael. Investigators also discovered this individual had played with the three Runyan children for several minutes before they had accompanied him partway to his vehicle.

Although eyewitness memory enabled police to obtain an accurate physical description of the child's abductor from which they were able to construct a detailed composite drawing, the only witnesses to Rachael's abduction had been the three children. No CCTV had captured her abduction from the school grounds. As such, beyond police and media appeals, subsequent law enforcement efforts were effectively limited to procedures like forensic searches of the crime scene and house-to-house inquiries in the hours and days after the event.

Public appeals for information about Rachael's disappearance did lead to investigators receiving multiple leads both in relation to the whereabouts of the child and the possible identity of her abductor. Although all leads were vigorously pursued they ultimately proved fruitless.

Family efforts and media appeals
With assistance from an assembled neighborhood committee (many of whom donated money to an improvised family search effort), the Runyan family began its own efforts to search for their daughter. Both the family and neighborhood volunteers had limited means and methods for the search at their disposal, although a nationwide distribution of flyers displaying Rachael's picture was organized. With the assistance of friends and neighbors, the Runyan family searched local neighborhoods and distributed thousands of missing person posters and flyers alerting the public to Rachael's disappearance. Within three weeks, this initiative had cost the family $10,000 in postage expenses alone.

One week after Rachael's abduction, her parents flew to New York to attend a press conference intended to maintain the extensive publicity surrounding their daughter's disappearance. At this press conference, Jeff Runyan said: "I feel [the abductor] is without conscience, and my plea is for someone who knows him to come forward and sell him out." Acknowledging the possibility Rachael might have been sold following her abduction, Elaine Runyan urged all parents planning on adopting a little girl in the near future to ensure the child was not Rachael.

On September 3, Rachael's parents appeared on the Today show to continue to publicize Rachael's disappearance. They offered a $20,000 reward raised largely through donations from concerned citizens in their community. The city of Sunset also pledged an additional $20,000 for the child's safe return.

Discovery
Close to a pile of brush, the children observed what they initially believed was a doll, partly covered in shrubbery floating at the edge of the stream. On closer inspection, the children realized the doll was actually the nude body of a female toddler with her hands bound behind her back.

Rachael's relatives were able to offer tentative identification of her body from a chipped tooth and piercings in her ears. Due to the advanced state of the body's decomposition, the precise cause of Rachael's death was never established. The coroner was unable to exclude smothering as the cause of death.

Funeral
Shortly after the formal identification of their daughter, Jeff and Elaine Runyan held Rachael's funeral service  at the Sunset Stake Center. Over 300 mourners were in attendance. Rachael was laid to rest in Washington Heights Memorial Park in the city of Ogden, Utah. She was buried in a white casket adorned with her photograph, a single pink rosebud, and one of her favorite Raggedy Ann dolls. Rachael's gravestone is inscribed with the words: "She brought a nation to its knees."

Federal impact
The abduction and murder of Rachael Runyan proved to be a major factor in the October 1982 passage of a federal law allowing the parents of missing children access to a clearinghouse administered by the Federal Bureau of Investigation (FBI), which would obtain and file records of the fingerprints and blood types of more than 300,000 Utah children.

As a result of this abduction and murder, the state of Utah also formally implemented the "Rachael Alert" child abduction alert system in April 2002. It was designed to alert residents statewide of active child abduction and missing children cases. Once law enforcement personnel verified the authenticity of a child abduction case, a "Rachael Alert" form was faxed to all television and radio networks for immediate and high-priority statewide broadcast. The criteria to be met in these cases included: the missing child was a minor or mentally handicapped; that they were in imminent danger; that the disappearance was not a runaway situation; and that law enforcement had a complete and accurate physical description of the missing child.

The "Rachael Alert" system was only used in the June 2002 abduction of Elizabeth Smart and the January 2003 abduction of 3-month-old Nicholas Triplett; both children were ultimately found alive. In the wake of Elizabeth Smart's subsequent safe recovery, 41 states implemented the AMBER Alert child abduction alert system. Utah replaced the "Rachael Alert" system with the AMBER Alert system in April 2003—primarily to conform with nationwide standards. The AMBER Alert system is now tested twice a year in Utah— on January 13 and on the anniversary of Rachael's abduction, August 26.

Rachael's murder was also a factor in the passing of the Missing Children's Act, which places descriptions of missing children in the FBI's National Crime Information Computer database.

Ongoing investigation

Reopening of case
Although Rachael's murder is an unsolved case, Lieutenant Phil Olmstead, who first answered Elaine Runyan's frantic call for assistance following her daughter's abduction, continually assured the Runyan family of the Sunset Police Department's determination to find Rachael's murderer or murderers. The investigation into her murder was officially reopened by the Sunset Police Department in 2007. Police continue working closely with the Utah Attorney General's office in their efforts to apprehend and convict the perpetrator(s). A reward of $58,000 is available should any information leading to the arrest and subsequent conviction of the person or persons responsible be provided to authorities.

Hopes for the identification of the perpetrator rest primarily on notable advances in forensic technology in the years since 1982. As a means to this end, investigators have not ruled out the possibility of exhuming Rachael's body to retrieve further forensic evidence.

DNA testing conducted on items found near Rachael's body in 2007 yielded tentative results, although they have not helped advance the investigation. Rachael's family has never given up hope her killer will be found.

Suspects
In 2012, investigators announced that a prison inmate in Pennsylvania who had been a resident of Sunset in 1982 was under active investigation. Although no formal charges have been filed against this individual, he is considered a possible suspect in Rachael's abduction and murder. Another potential suspect is a man with a criminal record who is believed to live in New Mexico. Sunset Police Chief Ken Eborn has said that evidence supporting the potential guilt of this suspect exists, but it is insufficient for police to make a formal arrest. Furthermore, Eborn has said he is convinced that witnesses or individuals with knowledge of the man's guilt are reluctant to come forward to authorities—possibly because of death threats he has made against them.

Advocacy and legacy

Following her daughter's abduction and murder, Elaine Runyan-Simmons channeled her grief into action, becoming an outspoken advocate in a national movement to raise awareness of issues regarding child safety, child abduction, and the legislated procedures regarding their recovery. Runyan-Simmons has frequently offered emotional support, guidance and advice to parents undergoing a similar experience to her family's ordeal.

Regarding her ongoing commitment to the perpetuation and expansion of Utah's "Rachael Alert" child abduction alert system (which was subsumed under the nationwide AMBER alert system in 2003), Runyan-Simmons has said that being a voice in this field of advocacy is not a choice she would have made had Rachael not been abducted and murdered: the events of August and September 1982 left her with little choice in this matter. In 2013, Runyan-Simmons stated: "It's a legacy I leave for my daughter. If there was something in place like this [in 1982], maybe we'd still have her."

In May 2016, the park where Rachael was abducted was renamed Rachael Runyan Memorial Park. It was formally dedicated to Rachael's memory on August 26; a memorial stone bearing an image of the girl, a brief summary of her story, and the park's name stands within its grounds. The inscription on the stone reads: "In honor of Rachael Marie Runyan, June 23, 1979 - August 26, 1982. Abducted from Doxey Elementary Playground August 26, 1982."

The Rachael Runyan Missing and Exploited Children's Day was signed into legislation in Utah in March 2017. The stated aim of this annual observance is to encourage individuals in Utah to prioritize child safety. The bill was inspired by Rachael Runyan, and has been described as a "catalyst for the development of better responses to (child) abduction" within Utah. In instances where an AMBER Alert is implemented and the missing child is subsequently found safe and well, a "Rachael Runyan Award" is presented to the individual who either locates the missing child or initially alerted authorities to his or her abduction.

Media

Television
 The murder of Rachael Runyan is featured in an episode of the true crime series Unsolved Mysteries. Commissioned and broadcast by NBC, this episode was first aired on November 8, 1989, and features an interview with Rachael's mother, Elaine. This episode includes the suggestion Rachael may have been abducted and later murdered in the making of a snuff film.

Books

Podcast
 The podcast series "The Murder In My Family" has broadcast a 45-minute episode focusing on the abduction and murder of Rachael Runyan and the ongoing effect her loss continues to have on her family. This episode was initially broadcast in August 2018.

See also

 Amber alert
 Child abduction
 Child abuse
 Cold case
 Crime in Utah
 List of kidnappings
 List of murdered American children
 List of solved missing person cases
 List of unsolved murders

Notes

References

Cited works and further reading

External links
 2018 news article pertaining to the murder of Rachael Runyan
 Discussion relating to the abduction and murder of American children, held at the United States House of Representatives, January 1983 
 Elaine Runyan-Simmons at the Surviving Parents' Coalition
 Justice for Rachael Runyan Facebook page, administered by her mother Elaine
 KUTV news article detailing the renaming of Mitchell Park to the Rachael Runyan Memorial Park
 Lakepowelllife.com news article detailing the 35th anniversary of Rachael Runyan's murder
 Overview pertaining to the Missing Children's Assistance Act of 1983 at congress.gov
 

1980s missing person cases
1982 in Utah
1982 murders in the United States
August 1982 crimes
August 1982 events in the United States
Crimes against children
Deaths by person in Utah
Female murder victims
Formerly missing people
Incidents of violence against girls
Missing person cases in Utah
Murdered American children
People murdered in Utah
Unsolved murders in the United States